Kushal Bhurtel (born 22 January 1997) is a Nepalese cricketer. In November 2019, he was named in Nepal's squad for the 2019 ACC Emerging Teams Asia Cup in Bangladesh. He made his List A debut for Nepal, against India, in the Emerging Teams Cup on 14 November 2019. Prior to his List A debut, he was named in Nepal's squad for the 2016 Under-19 Cricket World Cup. Later the same month, he was also named in Nepal's squad for the men's cricket tournament at the 2019 South Asian Games. The Nepalese team won the bronze medal, after they beat the Maldives by five wickets in the third-place playoff match.

In April 2021, he was named in Nepal's Twenty20 International (T20I) squad for the 2020–21 Nepal Tri-Nation Series. He made his T20I debut on 17 April 2021, for Nepal against the Netherlands. Nepal beat the Netherlands by nine wickets, Bhurtel top-scoring with 62 runs. Bhurtel set a record of becoming the first cricketer to score three consecutive half-centuries in three consecutive innings from his debut in T20Is. He was named the man of the series, after scoring 278 runs, with an average of 69.50 in the five matches he played. In May 2021, following his performance in the tri-series, Bhurtel was nominated for the ICC's Men's Player of the Month award.

In August 2021, Bhurtel was named in Nepal's One Day International (ODI) squad for their series against Papua New Guinea in Oman, and their squad for round six of the 2019–2023 ICC Cricket World Cup League 2 tournament, also in Oman. He made his ODI debut on 7 September 2021, for Nepal against Papua New Guinea.

In February 2022, he was named in Nepal's T20I squad for the 2022 ICC Men's T20 World Cup Global Qualifier A tournament in Oman. In Nepal's second match of the tournament, against the Philippines, Bhurtel scored his first century in a T20I match.

References

External links
 

1997 births
Living people
Nepalese cricketers
Nepal One Day International cricketers
Nepal Twenty20 International cricketers
South Asian Games bronze medalists for Nepal
South Asian Games medalists in cricket
People from Butwal
People from Rupandehi District